Jeon Ji-hoo is a South Korean actor and model. He is best known for his roles in New Tales of Gisaeng, Jejungwon, Master of Study, and Save Me 2. He also appeared in Music Video of 2NE1 song "I Don't Care".

Filmography

Television

Film

References

External links 
 
 
 

1985 births
Living people
21st-century South Korean male actors
South Korean male models
South Korean male television actors
South Korean male film actors